The University of Wyoming men's basketball program, which competes in the Mountain West Conference, has a lengthy tradition dating back to 1905. Wyoming won the 1943 NCAA championship under Hall of Fame coach Everett Shelton and behind star guard Ken Sailors, who pioneered the jump shot that is now the standard in basketball. Wyoming has made a total of 16 appearances in the NCAA tournament.  Since the Mountain West was formed in 1999, Wyoming has won two conference titles, including an outright championship in 2002.  Prior to that, Wyoming won five championships in the Western Athletic Conference, eight championships in the Skyline Conference, and one championship in the Rocky Mountain Athletic Conference.

History

The Wyoming basketball program began in 1904 when a group known as the "Laramie Town Team" challenged a team from the university to a basketball game; Wyoming won that game by a score of 17–5.  The team became a powerhouse in the 1930s under coach Willard "Dutch" Witte, who led the 1934 Cowboy team to a 26–3 record. Wyoming was retroactively named the 1934 national champion by the Helms Foundation. Witte coached a total of nine seasons in Laramie and compiled a 134–51 record.

After Witte stepped down in 1939, Everett Shelton took over the team and went on to become the winningest coach in Wyoming history in his 19 years in Laramie.  Although Shelton went just 6–10 in his first season, his teams would win 20 or more games seven times during his career.  In 1943, the Cowboys went 31–2 and won the NCAA tournament.  That team was led by Ken Sailors, who scored 16 points in the championship game victory over Georgetown on his way to being named the tournament's Most Outstanding Player.  In addition, Sailors was named college basketball's Player of the Year in 1943 and again in 1946 after returning from fighting in World War II.  In all, the Cowboys made eight NCAA tournament appearances under Shelton, though they only won one game aside from the three-game run in 1943.

After Shelton retired in 1959, Wyoming basketball lay dormant for some time.  Including Shelton's last four campaigns as head coach, the Cowboys endured nine consecutive losing seasons from 1956 to 1964.  Coach Bill Strannigan, who succeeded Shelton, had just six winning seasons in 14 years as head coach and made one NCAA Tournament appearance in 1967 in which the Cowboys were handed a lopsided loss at the hands of eventual national champion UCLA and its All-American center Lew Alcindor, who later changed his name to Kareem Abdul-Jabbar.  Again from 1971 through 1978, the Cowboys had one winning season, a 17–10 campaign under Don DeVoe in 1976–77.

In 1978, Jim Brandenburg became the Cowboys' head coach and the program experienced a resurgence.  In his nine seasons, Wyoming did not have a single losing season and made four NCAA Tournament appearances.  In 1981, the Cowboys were 24–6 and reached the second round of the NCAA tournament.  In addition to being the Cowboys' first tournament appearance since 1967, it was their first 20-win season since 1952–53 and first NCAA Tournament victory since 1952.  After guiding the Cowboys to the Sweet 16 in 1987, however, Brandenburg left the Cowboys to become the coach at conference rival San Diego State.  He was replaced by Benny Dees, who went 26–6 in his first year with the Cowboys and returned them to the NCAA Tournament where they lost in the first round of the 1988 NCAAs to Loyola-Marymount.

Larry Shyatt went 19–9 in 1997–98, his only season in Laramie before becoming the head coach at Clemson University.  After his departure, Steve McClain took over the head coaching job and had three consecutive 20-win seasons from 2001 to 2003, including conference titles in 2001 and 2002 and an NCAA Tournament appearance in 2002. On March 22, 2007, Wyoming hired former Portland State head coach Heath Schroyer to become its next head coach. Shyatt was hired yet again as Wyoming's head coach after the 2010–11 season ended due to the firing of Heath Schroyer. The 2010–11 team's top two scorers left the program afterwards, with Desmar Jackson and Amath M'Baye transferring to Southern Illinois University and the University of Oklahoma, respectively.

The Cowboys went 21–12 in Shyatt's first season, for their first 20–win season in 9 years. They made the College Basketball Invitational each of the next three seasons, making the quarterfinals in 2012 and 2013. In the 2014–15 season, the Cowboys finished with a record of 25–10, won the Mountain West Conference tournament over San Diego State 45–43, and earned an automatic bid to the NCAA tournament. Larry Nance Jr. was drafted by the Los Angeles Lakers with the 27th pick in the 2015 NBA draft, becoming Wyoming's first player selected in the draft since Theo Ratliff in 1995. On March 21, 2016, Shyatt announced his resignation from the head coaching job, and Allen Edwards was announced as the 21st head coach in program history.

In Edwards' first season, the Cowboys went 23–15 and won the CBI tournament, defeating Coastal Carolina in the championship. Edwards again won 20 games in his second season. In 2019, Justin James was drafted 40th overall by the Sacramento Kings, becoming the second Cowboy in the decade to be taken in the NBA draft. On December 9, 2019, the program retired Fennis Dembo's no. 34 jersey. Following two disappointing campaigns where the Cowboys failed to win 10 games each year, Edwards was let go as head coach. Jeff Linder was hired as the 22nd head coach in program history on March 17, 2020.

In Linder’s first season with the Cowboys, he led the team to a 14-11 year despite inheriting a team with only 6 conference wins the two seasons prior. This included a 6-1 non-conference record highlighted by a road win against eventual Elite Eight participant Oregon State. The team’s season ended in the Mountain West tournament quarterfinals 69-66 to eventual champion San Diego State.

Head coaching records

Postseason

NCAA tournament results
The Cowboys have appeared in the NCAA tournament 16 times, with a combined record of 9–21. They were national champions in 1943.

NIT results
The Cowboys have appeared in the National Invitation Tournament (NIT) eight times, with a combined record of 7–8.

CBI results
The Cowboys have appeared in the College Basketball Invitational (CBI) five times, with a combined record of 7–5. They were champions in 2017.

National Campus Basketball Tournament results
The Cowboys appeared in the only National Campus Basketball Tournament, with a record of 1–2.

Records vs. Mountain West opponents
As of Mar. 11, 2022

Notable players

Statistical leaders

Career leaders
Source:

Single-season leaders

Retired numbers

All-Americans

Arena

The Arena-Auditorium, which seats 11,612, serves as the home court for the Cowboy basketball team.  Since its opening in 1982, the Cowboys have enjoyed a strong homecourt advantage at the AA.

Wyoming's first home court was a small, red brick building known as the "Little Red Gym."  That was followed by the Half Acre Gym, which served as the Cowboys' home from 1925 to 1951 and seated just over 4,000; the Cowboys had a record of 222-44 in the building.  The Cowboys moved into War Memorial Fieldhouse in 1951 and remained there until the Arena-Auditorium opened in 1982.

References

External links